Radha Raghavan (born 3 June 1961) is an Indian National Congress politician from Kerala. She has been a member of the Kerala Legislative Assembly for two terms and resigned from her second one.

Early life
Radha Raghavan was born on 3 June 1961 and attended school till secondary level.

Career
Raghavan has been the  Madhya Varjana Samithi's Kerala President and the chairperson of Adivasi Vikas Parishad beside being a member of the working committee of Democratic India Congress. She is affiliated to the Indian National Congress (INC) party. Following the death of her husband, an INC politician, the party decided to field her in the North Wayanad constituency reserved for members of the scheduled tribes. She won the election conducted for the Tenth Kerala Legislative Assembly. She was re-elected for another term but resigned while being an MLA. Raghavan has gained recognition for her social work aimed at uplifting the condition of marginalized communities; scheduled castes and scheduled tribes.

Personal life
With her husband K. Raghavan Master she has one son and two daughters.

References

1961 births
Living people
Indian National Congress politicians from Kerala
Women in Kerala politics